Real-time or real time describes various operations in computing or other processes that must guarantee response times within a specified time (deadline), usually a relatively short time. A real-time process is generally one that happens in defined time steps of maximum duration and fast enough to affect the environment in which it occurs, such as inputs to a computing system.

Examples of real-time operations include:

Computing
 Real-time computing,  hardware and software systems subject to a specified time constraint
 Real-time clock, a computer clock that keeps track of the current time
 Real-time Control System, a reference model architecture suitable for software-intensive, real-time computing
 Real-time Programming Language, a compiled database programming language which expresses work to be done by a particular time

Applications
 Real-time computer graphics,  sub-field of computer graphics focused on producing and analyzing images in real time
 Real-time camera system, for controlling cameras in a 3D virtual environment
 Real-time operating system, for running real-time software
 Real-time protection, protection enabled constantly, rather than by, say, a virus scan
 Real-time text, transmitted as it is being typed or produced
 Real time Java, for real-time programs in Java
 Real-time disk encryption, encrypting data as it is written to disk
 Real-time web, whereby information is sent to users as it becomes available
 Live streaming, continuously delivering multimedia in real time
 Collaborative real-time editor, simultaneous editing of a document by several users
 Real-time simulation, simulation able to run at the same rate as reality
 Real-time Blackhole List, a DNS blacklist
 Real-time Cmix, a music programming language
 Real Time AudioSuite, an audio plug-in for Pro Tools

Other science and technology
 Real-time locating system, a system used to automatically identify and track the location of objects or people in real time
 Real-time gross settlement, an online system for settling financial transactions
 Real-time kinematic, a satellite navigation technique
 Real-time polymerase chain reaction, a laboratory technique which monitors target DNA during the PCR